The 1989 Champ Car season may refer to:
 the 1988–89 USAC Championship Car season, which was just one race, the 73rd Indianapolis 500 
 the 1989 CART PPG Indy Car World Series, sanctioned by CART, who would later become Champ Car